Beccy's Big Hits is the first greatest hits album by Australian country music singer Beccy Cole. The album celebrates 20 years since Cole burst onto the national Country Music scene winning the Star Maker award at the 1993 Australian Country Music Awards.
 
The album was released in May 2013. Upon release, Cole described the album as "a Country Music version of a box of Cadbury favourites!"

Track listing
 "This Heart" – 3:50
 "Shiny Things" – 4:00
 "Lifeboat" (Live) – 3:46
 "Mother Knows Best"  (featuring Carole Sturtzel)  – 3:57
 "Too Strong to Break" – 3:33
 "Waitress" – 4:20
 "Blackwood Hill" – 4:51
 "Sorry I Asked" – 4:43
 "Clown Song" – 4:12
 "Rainbows, Dreams and Butterflies" – 3:57
 "Millionaires"  (featuring Kasey Chambers)  – 3:47
 "Girls Out Here" – 4:18
 "Poster Girl" (Live) – 4:00
 "Lazy Bones" (Live) – 9:53

Weekly charts

Release history

References

2013 greatest hits albums
Compilation albums by Australian artists
Beccy Cole albums